Verses of Steel is the twelfth studio album by the Polish thrash metal band Acid Drinkers. It was released on 7 July 2008 in Poland through Mystic Production. It is the only album to feature Alex "Olass" Mendyk due to his death in late November 2008.

The album was recorded from March to April 2008 (drums & vocals were recorded at the Perlazza studio in Opalenica while guitar & bass were recorded at Jet studio in Nowy Dwór). It was mixed at Chimp Studio, London, and Tower Studio, Wrocław. The cover art was created by Mentalporn.com and fotos by Paulina Mencel.

Track listing

Reception 

The album was well received in their country, gaining three nominations for the Fryderyk Musical Awards (Poland) for production, composition and best Heavy Metal album.
It was described as a traditional European thrash metal album with a few crossover elements.

Personnel 
 Tomasz "Titus" Pukacki – vocals, bass
 Alex "Olass" Mendyk – guitar, vocals
 Dariusz "Popcorn" Popowicz – guitar, vocals
 Maciej "Ślimak" Starosta – drums
Music and lyrics – Acid Drinkers
Engineered – Maciej Feddek, Aleksander Mendyk
Vocal co-producer – Przemysław "Perła" Wjemann
Bartek Dębicki – solo in "Blues Beatdown"

Charts

Release history

References 

Acid Drinkers albums
2008 albums
Mystic Production albums